Frank Recruitment Group is an international specialist technology staffing business based in Newcastle upon Tyne, England.

The company consists of nine recruitment brands, focusing primarily on products within the enterprise resource planning, client relationship management, big data and cloud computing segments.

It was established in 2006 under the Nigel Frank International brand. The American investment company TPG Capital, which also invests in Spotify and Airbnb, became the majority shareholder in 2016.

History

Frank Recruitment Group was established in 2006 with the launch of Nigel Frank International, founded by Sean Wadsworth and Nigel O’Donoghue.

According to the Newcastle-based newspaper the Evening Chronicle, the company "has made a name for itself in the niche, enterprise software market", and has expanded to open offices in London, Amsterdam, Denver, Berlin, Melbourne, New York, San Francisco, Singapore, Philadelphia, Dallas, Cologne, Warsaw, Barcelona, Tampa, Scottsdale, Zurich, Charlotte, Chicago, Toronto, Irvine, Frankfurt, Barcelona, Madrid, Geneva and Tokyo.

In 2013, the company raised £22 million from ISIS Equity Partners (later Livingbridge) – and HSBC Bank plc. ISIS took a 35% stake in the company. US investment firm TPG Capital became a majority stakeholder in April 2016. At the time of the transaction, the company was valued at just under £200m.
In 2018, the staffing firm launched two new brands, Jefferson Frank and Nelson Frank, focusing on Amazon Web Services (AWS) and ServiceNow recruitment respectively. A total of five new offices were opened in Amsterdam, Barcelona, Warsaw, Cologne and Denver, creating 400 jobs across Europe and the US in the process.

Subsidiaries and brands

The group has developed brands to focus on specific markets. Mason Frank was launched in 2010 and places  Salesforce cloud computing professionals into jobs. In 2014, the company launched two additional brands: Churchill Frank, which focuses on big data solutions, and Washington Frank, which specializes in staffing opportunities in cloud technology.

In 2016, the group launched Anderson Frank, which specialises in NetSuite recruitment.

July 2018 saw the launch of two new brands, bringing the total number of brands up to nine: Jefferson Frank and Nelson Frank, dedicated to AWS and ServiceNow recruitment. As of February 2019, the Group employs more than 2500 people across the world.

References 

Companies based in Newcastle upon Tyne
Business services companies established in 2006